Edward Graham may refer to:

Sir Edward Graham, 9th Baronet (1820–1864)
Edward (Bud) T. Graham (1927–2003), American classical recording engineer
Edward Kidder Graham (1876–1918), American educational administrator
Edward John Graham (1866–1918), Member of Parliament for Tullamore, 1914–18
Edward T. P. Graham (1872–1964), American architect
Ed Graham (born 1977), English musician, original drummer of the rock band The Darkness
Eddie Graham (1930–1985), American professional wrestler
Eddie Graham (politician) (1897–1957), Australian politician

See also